Fabián Cuero Segura, known as Fabián Cuero (born 7 January 1994) is a Colombian football player who plays for UD Oliveirense.

Club career
He made his professional debut in the Segunda Liga for Braga B on 15 August 2015 in a game against Gil Vicente.

International
He scored 4 goals for Colombia at the 2011 South American Under-17 Football Championship.

References

Colombian footballers
Colombian expatriate footballers
Expatriate footballers in Argentina
Club Tijuana footballers
Expatriate footballers in Mexico
Llaneros F.C. players
S.C. Braga B players
Liga Portugal 2 players
U.D. Oliveirense players
Colombia youth international footballers
Sportspeople from Valle del Cauca Department
Living people
1994 births
Association football forwards